Garrett Marino (born August 3, 1994) is an American football defensive lineman for the Michigan Panthers of the United States Football League (USFL). He played for the Saskatchewan Roughriders for a season and a half before he was released following several suspensions and controversial hits. He played college football for the UAB Blazers at Alabama-Birmingham. He was born in Mission Viejo, California and played high school football at Mission Viejo High School. He was also a member of the Dallas Cowboys.

College career
Marino committed to play at Arizona State on January 15, 2013. He did not qualify academically though and moved on to Montana State for the 2014 NCAA season. Marino played six games for the Bobcats contributing with eight tackles. On October 20, 2014 he was dismissed by the Montana State football team.

He signed a letter of intent on January 15, 2013 to play college football for the UAB Blazers at Alabama-Birmingham. UAB football was terminated for the 2015 and 2016 seasons, but returned in 2017. Marino played 40 games for the Blazers compiling 95 tackles, 10 sacks and one forced fumble. He also returned one fumble recovery for a 48-yard touchdown. He was named First Team All-Conference USA after the conclusion of his senior season, after being honourable mentions in each of the two previous seasons.

Professional career

NFL 
At his pro day, Marino ran a 4.89 40-yard dash and put up 41 official reps on bench press. In preparation for the NFL Draft he played in the 2020 Shrine Bowl, making two tackles and one tackle for loss. Marino turned 26 years old before the 2020 NFL regular season began. After going undrafted in the 2020 NFL draft Marino signed with the Dallas Cowboys.

CFL 
Marino joined the Roughriders for the 2021 season. In the Banjo Bowl against the Winnipeg Blue Bombers in 2021 he was ejected from the game from throwing punches. He concluded his first season in the CFL having played in seven games and contributed with 13 defensive tackles and four sacks.

In a game against the Ottawa Redblacks in 2022, Marino hit Jeremiah Masoli with a low hit, injuring Masoli's leg.  Masoli was predicted to be out for 10–12 weeks after having surgery to repair the damage caused by Marino's hit. Marino celebrated the hit and injury to the dismay of the Ottawa players. Following the game, Marino was summoned for a disciplinary hearing and he was subsequently suspended for four games as a result of his actions. Reasons for his suspension were listed by Commissioner Randy Ambrosie as two games for a low and dangerous hit and then celebrating the hit, another game for an illegal and reckless tackle on an offensive lineman on an earlier play, and a fourth and final game for "verbal comments made about Masoli's heritage during the game". He finished serving his suspension in the middle of August 2022 and returned to action for the Riders' Week 11 match against the BC Lions. Following his first game back from a suspension Marino was fined by the league for unnecessary roughness. The following week Marino was involved in another controversial play in which he leveled the Winnipeg Blue Bombers starting quarterback Zach Collaros while the ball was not in the vicinity of either player. He was released by the Riders two days later on September 6, 2022. Marino finished his second season in the league with nine tackles and a sack in eight games.

USFL 
On September 18, 2022, Marino announced on Twitter that he had signed a contract with the Michigan Panthers of the United States Football League (USFL). The team announced his signing on October 6.

References

External links
CFL.ca bio
Saskatchewan Roughriders bio
UAB Blazers bio
NFL Draft bio

1994 births
American football defensive linemen
Living people
Canadian football defensive linemen
Dallas Cowboys players
Michigan Panthers (2022) players
Saskatchewan Roughriders players
UAB Blazers football players